An Ottoman raid on the Balearic Islands occurred in 1501 under the Ottoman admiral Kemal Reis. This raid was combined with attacks on Sardinia and Pianosa (near the island of Elba).

The 1501 raid on the Balearics followed some of the earliest interventions of the Ottomans in the western Mediterranean. These interventions were in response to the Fall of Granada and the help the last Muslim ruler there had requested from the Ottoman Empire in his fight against Castile. Upon this request, the Ottoman sultan Bayezid sent a fleet under Kemal Reis to attack the Spanish coast. In 1487 and again in 1492 when Granada fell, the Ottoman fleet was used to rescue refugees and ferry them to the coast of North Africa. 

A side effect of the raid seems to have been that a Spanish sailor was captured in possession of an early map of Columbus.

See also
 Barbary slave trade
 Ottoman wars in Europe
 Ottoman invasion of the Balearic Islands (1558)

Notes

Balearics 1501
Battles in the Balearic Islands
Conflicts in 1501
1501 in Europe
1500s in the Ottoman Empire